was a Japanese novelist and short-story writer, and a member of the so-called "Third Generation of Postwar Writers" (第3の新人).

Life 
Yoshiyuki was born in Okayama, the oldest child of author Yoshiyuki Eisuke, but his family moved to Tokyo when he was 3. He attended Shizuoka High School, where he grew interested in Thomas Mann's stories, and in 1945 entered the University of Tokyo. He left the university without a degree and began working full-time as an editor at a weekly scandal magazine, while spending much of his leisure time gambling, drinking, and frequenting prostitutes. Sexuality and prostitution would form a consistent theme in his writing.

Works and awards
Yoshiyuki's first published fiction was Bara Hanbainin (薔薇販売人, The Rose Seller, 1950), followed by the novels Genshoku no Machi (The City of Primary Colors, 1951, revised 1956), Shū (驟雨, Sudden Shower, 1954), for which he won the Akutagawa Prize, and Shofu no Heya (Room of a Whore, 1958). His novel Anshitsu (暗室, The Dark Room, 1969) won the Tanizaki Prize. He won the Yomiuri Prize for his 1974 novel . Another of his most celebrated works, Yugure Made (夕暮れまで, 1978, published in English translation as Toward Dusk and Other Stories by Kurodahan Press, 2011), took 13 years to write but once published quickly became a best-seller and won the Noma Literary Prize. See also Fair Dalliance: Fifteen Stories by Yoshiyuki Junnosuke, Kurodahan Press, 2011.

References

External links
 Junnosuke Yoshiyuki at J'Lit Books from Japan 
 Japan Times review of Toward Dusk and Other Stories 
 Writers Noone Reads compilation on works in English 

20th-century Japanese novelists
Japanese male short story writers
People from Okayama
1924 births
1994 deaths
Akutagawa Prize winners
Yomiuri Prize winners
University of Tokyo alumni
20th-century Japanese short story writers
20th-century Japanese male writers